Marin Čilić won the singles tennis title at the 2012 Queen's Club Championships with the score at 6–7(3–7), 4–3, after David Nalbandian was defaulted from the tournament for kicking an advertising board, resulting in a cut leg for a line judge.

Andy Murray was the defending champion, but lost in the second round to Nicolas Mahut.

Seeds
The top eight seeds receive a bye into the second round.

Draw

Finals

Top half

Section 1

Section 2

Bottom half

Section 3

Section 4

Qualifying

Seeds

Qualifiers

Lucky loser
  Ryan Sweeting

Qualifying draw

First qualifier

Second qualifier

Third qualifier

Fourth qualifier

References
General

Main Draw
Qualifying Draw

Specific

Singles